The 20th Regiment of Light Dragoons was a cavalry regiment of the British Army.

History
The regiment was raised as the 20th (Jamaica) Regiment of (Light) Dragoons in 1792; it was deployed to Jamaica in 1795 during the Second Maroon War. The regiment saw action at the Battle of Montevideo in February 1807 during the British invasions of the River Plate. The 3rd Squadron was the sole cavalry detachment present in the Alexandria expedition later that year. It also fought at the Battle of Vimeiro in August 1808 during the Peninsular War. In 1805 its title was simplified again to the 20th Regiment of (Light) Dragoons; it was disbanded in 1818.

References

Sources

Cavalry regiments of the British Army
Dragoons
Dragoon regiments of the British Army
Light Dragoons
Military units and formations established in 1792
Military units and formations disestablished in 1818
1792 establishments in Great Britain